Sofie From-Emmesberger is a Finnish diplomat who was appointed Director General of the Department for Africa and the Middle East on June 29, 2021.  The appoint is for a fixed term from October 15, 2021 until August 31, 2025.

Until that appointment, she had been chair of the Political and Security Committee since 2018. She also served as the Finnish ambassador to Kenya and NATO.

References

Finnish women ambassadors
Ambassadors of Finland to Kenya
Year of birth missing (living people)
Living people